General elections were held in the Turks and Caicos Islands on 2 February 1995. The result was a victory for the opposition People's Democratic Movement (PDM), which won eight of the thirteen seats in the Legislative Council. Following the elections, PDM leader Derek Hugh Taylor became Chief Minister.

Electoral system
The thirteen members of the Legislative Council were elected from single-member constituencies, a change from the system used between 1988 and 1991 when they were elected from five multi-member constituencies.

Campaign
A total of 33 candidates contested the elections; the Progressive National Party (PNP) and PDM both ran full slates of 13 candidates, with an additional seven candidates running as independents.

Results

References

Elections in the Turks and Caicos Islands
Turks
1995 in the Turks and Caicos Islands
February 1995 events in North America